George Gardiner (15 December 1877 – 28 February 1933) was an Australian rules footballer who played with St Kilda in the Victorian Football League (VFL).

Gardiner was recruited from Milawa Football Club.

Notes

External links 

1877 births
1933 deaths
Australian rules footballers from Victoria (Australia)
St Kilda Football Club players